Bryn Celyn is an area in the  community of Llangoed, Ynys Môn, Wales, which is 131.2 miles (211.1 km) from Cardiff and 207.8 miles (334.4 km) from London.

Notable people 
 Mary Dendy (1855–1933) a promoter of residential schools for mentally handicapped people, i.e. institutionalisation.

References

See also
List of localities in Wales by population 

Villages in Anglesey